Stacie Foster is an actress, known for her roles in Night of the Living Dead (1990 film), Cyber Tracker 2, and Steel Frontier.

Filmography
 USA High
 episode "Excess's Ex" as Judith
 Saved by the Bell: The New Class
 episode "Mission: Control" as Shelly
 episode "Into the Woods" as Shelly
 1997 Another World as Kristen
 Baywatch Nights
 episode "Circle of Fear" as Young Woman
 Silk Stalkings
 episode "Runway Strip" as Barbara Ferry
 1995 Cyber-Tracker 2 as Connie
 1995 Steel Frontier as Sarah
 1994 CyberTracker as Connie
 Star Trek: The Next Generation
 episode "Relics" as Lieutenant Bartel
 Saved by the Bell
 episode "Rockumentary" as Mindy Wallace
 1990 Night of the Living Dead as Doll's Mom Zombie

References

External links 
 

American film actresses
American television actresses
Year of birth missing (living people)
Living people
Place of birth missing (living people)
21st-century American women